was a Japanese actress, whose real name was . She was notable for her prominent role in Akira Kurosawa's 1954 film Seven Samurai. She also starred in Japanese television series such as Sakura and Kimi ga Jinsei no Toki.

Born in Nagasaki Prefecture, she married Ichio Mori, then director of Tokyo Broadcasting System (TBS), in 1957.
She died of stomach cancer on 1 August 2012 at a hospital in Chuo, Tokyo, aged 86.

Filmography

Film

A Ball at the Anjo House (1947) - Yôko Shinkawa
Idainaru X (1948) - Chiyo
Kanashiki Kuchibue (1949)
Yume o meshimase (1950) - Midori Matsumura
Kikyô (1950) - Tomoko Moriya
The Bells of Nagasaki (1950)
Onna no mizu-kagami (1951) - Kimiko Fujikura
Tora no kiba (1951)
Tenshi mo yume o miru (1951)
Fireworks Over the Sea (1951) - Yukiko Nomura
Tekirei san'nin musume (1951) - Motoko Matsukawa
Nami (1952)
Tonkatsu taishô (1952) - Mayumi Sada
The Flavor of Green Tea over Rice (1952) - Setsuko Yamauchi
Mazô (1952)
Himeyuri no Tô (1953) - Teacher Miyagi
Sincerity (1953) - Kiyoko Nonomiya
Hiroba no kodoku (1953) - Fumie
Seven Samurai  (1954) - Shino
Kunisada Chūji (1954) - Otoyo
Ai to shi no tanima (1954)
Kuroi ushio (1954)
Josei ni kansuru jûni shô (1954) - Minako Tobishima
Hanran: Ni-ni-roku jiken (1954)
Banchô sara yashiki: Okiku to Harima (1954)
Ashizuri misaki (1954)
Ningen Gyorai Kaiten (1955)
Hana no yukue (1955) - Kazue Hashimoto
Tasogare sakaba (1955) - Emy Rosa
Ukikusa nikki (1955)
Kyatsu o nigasuna (1956) - Kimiko Fujisaki
Tengoku wa doko da (1956)
Onibi (1956)
Kojinbutu no fufu (1956)
Nemuri Kyôshirô burai hikae (1956)
Oshaberi shacho (1957)
Yama to kawa no aru machi (1957)
Kono futari ni sachi are (1957)
Nemuri Kyôshirô burai hikae dainibu (1957)
Yoshida to Sanpei monogatari: Ohanake no sekai (1957)
Kuchi kara demakase (1958)
Kigeki ekimae ryokan (1958)
Tsuzurikata kyodai (1958) - Natsu
Suzukake no sanpomichi (1959) - Nobuko Takahata
Sôtome ke no musume tachi (1962) - Hatsuko Yoshimura
Nippon dabi katsukyu (1970)
Futari dake no asa (1971)
Jinsei gekijô (1973)
Shiosai (1975) - Wife of a light house keeper
Kigeki Daiyûkai (1976) - Hiroko Nakatani
Suri Ranka no ai to wakare (1976)
Tora-san's Forbidden Love (1984) - Shizuko
Haru kuru oni (1989)
Ashita (1995) - Sumiko Kanazawa
Nagoriyuki (2002) - Kenichiro's mother (final film role)

Television
 Daichūshingura (1971) - Ume
Sanga Moyu (1984) - Teru Amo
 Sanada Taiheiki (1985) - Kōdai-in
 Sakura (2002) - Toshiko Matsushita

References

External links

1926 births
2012 deaths
Japanese film actresses
Actors from Nagasaki Prefecture
Deaths from cancer in Japan
Deaths from stomach cancer
20th-century Japanese actresses
21st-century Japanese actresses